The Savage House is a historic three-storey townhouse in Nashville, Tennessee, USA.

History
The townhouse was built in the 1850s, prior to the American Civil War, and designed in the Italianate architectural style. In 1859, the house was acquired by Mary E. Claiborne, who turned it into a boarding house until 1881. Three years later, in 1884, it was acquired by Julius Sax, who rented it to the Standard Club, a Jewish private members' club, in 1891.

It was acquired by Dr. Giles Christopher Savage, an ophthalmologist and professor at the Vanderbilt University School of Medicine, in 1889. Savage used it as a practice, as did his daughter, Kate Savage Zerfoss, a Tulane University Medical School graduate who also taught at the Vanderbilt University Medical School. Her husband, Dr. Tom Zerfoss, was a physician with the Vanderbilt Student Health Service. Meanwhile, another one of Dr Savage's daughters, Portia Savage Ward, opened an antiques store, which closed down in 1980.

The building stands next to the Frost Building, another historic building listed on the NRHP.

Architectural significance
It has been listed on the National Register of Historic Places since January 11, 1983.

References

Houses on the National Register of Historic Places in Tennessee
Italianate architecture in Tennessee
Houses completed in 1859
Houses in Nashville, Tennessee
National Register of Historic Places in Nashville, Tennessee